Dacia Maraini (born November 13, 1936) is an Italian writer. Maraini's work focuses on women's issues, and she has written numerous plays and novels. She has won awards for her work, including the Formentor Prize for L'età del malessere (1963); the Premio Fregene for Isolina (1985); the Premio Campiello and Book of the Year Award for La lunga vita di Marianna Ucrìa (1990); and the Premio Strega for Buio (1999). In 2013, 
Irish Braschi's biographical documentary I Was Born Travelling told the story of her life, focusing in particular on her imprisonment in a concentration camp in Japan during World War II and the journeys she made around the world with her partner Alberto Moravia and close friends Pier Paolo Pasolini and Maria Callas.
In 2020 she adheres to Empathism.

Life and career

Early life
Maraini was born in  Fiesole, Tuscany. She is the daughter of Sicilian Princess Topazia Alliata di Salaparuta, an artist and art dealer, and of Fosco Maraini, a Florentine ethnologist and mountaineer of mixed Ticinese, English and Polish background who wrote in particular on Tibet and Japan.  When she was a child, her family moved to Japan in 1938 to escape Fascism. They were interned in a Japanese concentration camp in Nagoya from 1943 to 1946 for refusing to recognize Mussolini's Republic of Salò, allied with the Empire of Japan.  After the war, the family returned to Italy and lived in Sicily with her mother's family in the town of Bagheria, province of Palermo.

Not long after, her parents separated and her father moved to Rome where, some years later, at the age of eighteen, Maraini joined him. Maraini's work focuses on women's issues, and she has written numerous plays and novels. She was educated at L'Istituto Statale della Ss. Annunziata, a prestigious and privileged boarding school in Florence. Much of Maraini's writing was affected by her parents and the roles they played in her life. Maraini grew up with an adventurous father and a mother who was always burdened and, in addition to this, read books in which only men would go on quests and journeys. She states that she "became upset by the fact that no great journey could be taken by a woman..."

She married Lucio Pozzi, a Milanese painter, but they separated after four years.  She then became Alberto Moravia's companion, living with him from 1962 until 1983.

Career
In 1966, Maraini, Moravia and Enzo Siciliano founded the del Porcospino ("Porcupine") theatrical company which had as its mission the production of new Italian plays.  They included her own La famiglia normale, Moravia's L’intervista, Siciliano's Tazza, and works by Carlo Emilio Gadda, Goffredo Parise, J. Rodolfo Wilcock and Tornabuoni. 
In 1971 he signed the Open letter to L'Espresso on the Pinelli case against the police officer Luigi Calabresi. In 1973, she helped to found the Teatro della Maddalena which was run by women only.

Maraini directed L’amore coniugale from 1969 to 1973, her only feature film. In 1976 Maraini directed the films Mio padre amore mio ("My father my love"), Aborto: parlano le donne ("Abortion: women speak out"), Le ragazze di Capoverde ("The young women of Capoverde") and Ritratti di donne africane ("Portraits of African Women"), a three part series.

Maraini's writing in film includes the screenplay for L'età del malessere (1968), the screenplay for Kill the Fatted Calf and Roast It (1970), a script collaboration for Arabian Nights (1974), the documentary Aborto: Parlano le donne (1976), the screenplay for the TV Movie documentary Abrami in Africa (1976), the TV series documentary Ritratti di donne africane (1977), the screenplay for The Story of Piera (1983), and the screenplay for La bocca (1990).

Maraini has begun acting, recently appearing in Io sono nata viaggiando (2013) and narrating Caro Paolo (2013). She also appeared as herself in The Many Women of Fassbinder (1997), Midnight Journal (1990), Sophia: Ieri, oggi, domani (2007), Kulturzeit (2012), and Tutte le storie di Piera (2013).

Later life
Maraini is a prolific and well-known writer who continues to produce works today. Her most recent novel, Sguardo a Oriente, was published in May 2022.

Relationship with Italy 
In an interview with Monica Seger, Dacia Maraini stated that, despite her attachment to Italy and its culture, she does not feel like a cultural ambassador. Very often, she tries to analyze her country critically since being able to view the world through critical eyes is one of the duties of an intellectual. Her criticism is based on the expectations she has of her country; the more intellectuals try to be critical of their country, the more they want to see it function well. As an intellectual, Maraini tries "to illuminate, to persuade other people of what could be changed in a country that has possibility, a great country, a country of great people that have done great things"  because she wants "to persuade Italians that [they] can do better".

Writing and traveling 
Furthermore, the interview focuses on Maraini's meaning of being a writer and a critic. For instance, her book, La Seduzione dell’altrove, is very significant because it outlines her feeling towards her work. According to her, writing and travelling are both forms of illness and a therapy. They are an illness because they are stressful and tiring but a therapy because they give her an opportunity to “look from afar and perhaps see things better”.

Relationship between the theatre and public 
When discussing the importance of the relationship between her books and plays with the public, according to Maraini, the relationship with the public is more important in the theatre because, differently from books, plays deal with the collective and social aspect. While a novel is a more personal relationship with a single reader, plays focus on the live public that can be participating or not. Also, differently, it is easier to feel whether the public is participating or not compared to a book.

Work
Bagheria (1993) is Maraini's only autobiographical work to date. Maraini's works have a general pattern to which they abide; a series of short stories and novels reflect her "prefeminist stage" are characterized by a sense of alienation, total disorientation, and the need for self-assentation through sexuality. Maraini's "transitional stage," best characterized by her novel, A memoria, demonstrates a tone shifting from inaction to an active search for innovative expression. Maraini's subsequent and more progressive novels, such as Donna in guerra (Woman at War), in which her female characters break free of traditional gender roles and explore their sexuality and social activism, reflect Maraini's involvement in the feminist movement during the late sixties and early seventies.

Themes
Many reoccurring themes evident in Maraini's work are: personal freedom for women, exposing the use and abuse of power and its effects on women, women breaking free of traditional gender roles to explore their sexuality and social activism, the silencing of women in society and their appearance in the fashion-system, the seclusion and isolation of women as a result of women seeking their independence and freedom, motherhood as a form of confinement for women, and thus abortion as their only option, violence against and rape of women, women breaking free from being seen as sex objects, and characters' experience with homosexuality, pedophilia, and group sex.

Maraini and feminism
Although Maraini states she is a feminist only in the fact that she is always on the side of women, much of Maraini's work has been classified as feminist. The nature of Maraini's work evolves in line with women's changing position in Italian society and exposes the use and abuse of power and its effects on women. Maraini's progressive works helped change the general impression that women should solely fulfill domestic roles.

Dacia Maraini underwent “a process of evolution in ideology”   divided into two forms; one that outlines the individual's close relationships with reality and the other based on motivation to further the cause of women's rights. According to writers such as Pallotta, a series of short stories and novels reflected Maraini's prefeminist stage.  The literary works include La vacanza (The Vacation, 1962), L’età del malessere (1963). Her pre-feminist stage is characterized by the sense of alienation, total disorientation and the need for self-assentation through sexuality. Pallotta states “social and psychological disorientation [is] rooted in a passive consciousness that refuses to come to terms with reality”.   The transitional stage is characterized by the need to search for new modes of literary expression. These stages led to a feminist viewpoint that reflects a feminist awareness. Feminist novels include A memoria and Donna in Guerra. These novels are very significant and are a representation of the Italian Feminist Movement of 1968. The importance of these two works is the research of the protagonists’ “total unity.”  This total unity can be considered part of the constituent stage of her literary expression of feminism.

List of works 
La vacanza (1963; translated by Stuart Hood as The holiday : a novel, 1966)
L'età del malessere (1963, winner of Formentor Prize; translated by Frances Frenaye as The Age of Discontent  - also published as The Age of Malaise - 1963)
Memorie di una ladra (1973; translated by Nina Rootes as Memoirs of a Female Thief, 1973)
Short Play (in Wicked Women Revue 1973, Presented by Westbeth Playwrights Feminist Collective, USA)
Donne mie (1974, poetry)
Mio marito (1974, 17 short stories; translated by Vera F. Golini as My Husband, 2004)
Donna in guerra (1975; translated by Maria Benedetti and Elspeth Spottiswood as Woman at War, 1984)
[[Mary Stuart|Maria Stuarda]] (1975, theater)Dialogo di una prostituta col suo cliente (1978, theater) translated into English as Dialogue Between a Prostitute and her ClientMangiami pure (1978, poetry; translated by Genni Donati Gunn as Devour Me Too)Stravaganza (1978)Isolina (1985, winner of Premio Fregene; translated by Siân Williams as Isolina, 1993)La lunga vita di Marianna Ucrìa (1990, awarded Premio Campiello, book of the year award in Italy; translated by Dick Kitto & Elspeth Spottiswood as The Silent Duchess, 1992 - )Viaggiando con passo di volpe: Poesie, 1983-1991  (1991; winner of Mediterraneo Prize, 1991, and Città delle penne, 1992)Veronica, meretrice e scrittora (1991, theater)Veronica, meretrice e scrittora; La terza moglie di Mayer; Camille (2001, 3 plays)Bagheria (1993; translated by Dick Kitto and Elspeth Spottiswood as Bagheria, 1994 - )Voci (1994; awards include: Napoli 1995, Sibilla Aleramo, 1995; translated by Dick Kitto and Elspeth Spottiswood as Voices, 1997)Dolce per sé (1997)Se amando troppo (1998)Buio  (1999; winner of Premio Strega, 1999, 12 crime stories; translated as Darkness: Fiction by Martha King, 2002)Fare teatro (1966-2000) (2000, collection of plays)Colomba (2004)Il treno dell’ultima notte (2008; translated by Silvester Mazzarella as Train to Budapest, 2010 - )
 " La ragazza di via Maqueda" (2009) Raccolta di raccontiLa grande festa (2011)L'amore rubato (2012 - )Chiara d'Assisi: Elogio della disobbedienza (2013)
 La bambina e il sognatore (2015) 
 La mia vita, le mie battaglie (2015)
 Onda Marina e il Drago Spento (2019; illustrations by Simone Angelini - )
 Sguardo a Oriente (2022- )

 Awards and honours 
Maraini has garnered many awards for her work, including the International Formentor Prize (1963) for L'età del malessere, the Premio Fregene (1985), for Isolina, the Premio Campiello (1990), for "La lunga vita di Marianna Ucria," the Agrigento, Brancanti Zafferana, & Citta di Salerno (1997),  the Premio Strega (1999), for Buio.'' She also won the Premio Napoli & Sibilla Aleramo prize (1994) for "Voci," the Premio Mediterraneo and the Premio Citta di Penne for "Viaggiando con passo di volpe," the Sitges International Prize in Spain, the Premio Candcni, the Italian Premio Riccione, and she was both a finalist for the Man Booker International Prize and a nominee for the Nobel Prize in Literature (2012) New Shoes Theatre Website
In 2021 she received the Cilento Poetry Prize.

References

1936 births
Living people
People from Fiesole
Strega Prize winners
Italian women journalists
Italian women novelists
Premio Campiello winners
Italian women screenwriters
Italian film directors
Italian women film directors
Italian women dramatists and playwrights
Italian women poets